The term "biceps curl" refers to any of a number of weight training exercises that primarily targets the biceps brachii muscle. It may be performed using a barbell, dumbbell, resistance band, or other equipment.

Overview
The biceps curl mainly targets the biceps brachii, brachialis and brachioradialis muscles. The biceps is stronger at elbow flexion when the forearm is supinated (palms turned upward) and weaker when the forearm is pronated. The brachioradialis is at its most effective when the palms are facing inward, and the brachialis is unaffected by forearm rotation. Therefore, the degree of forearm rotation affects the degree of muscle recruitment between the three muscles.

Form 

A biceps curl usually starts with the arm in a fully extended position, holding a weight with a supinated (palms facing up) grip. A full repetition consists of bending or "curling" the elbow until it is fully flexed, then slowly lowering the weight to the starting position. The torso should remain upright instead of swinging back and forth, as doing so transfers the load away from the biceps and onto other muscles, reducing the effectiveness of the exercise. The elbows are also usually kept stationary at the side of the torso, as allowing the elbows to move in front of the weight's center of gravity removes tension on the biceps before full contraction is achieved.

To maximize the activation of biceps, conducting this exercise using the full range of motion is generally recommended. But for advanced trainers, they can apply a different variation of range in order to acquire some particular emphasis muscle activation. Some may argue that the tension on muscle is most significant during the mid-range, practice biceps curl with a half range of motion to let muscle generate the most force. 

The research found that the preacher curl targets the long head of the biceps significantly only when the arm was almost fully extended, and the range of motion was short. On the other hand, the incline dumbbell curl and the regular biceps curl activated the biceps brachii throughout the entire range of motion. They may be more effective in maximizing the biceps activation.

Variations

Several variations on the biceps curl by using different equipment, forms, and volume. But the general idea is still to target the biceps activation. Below are some typical variations using common equipment that are prevalent among trainers.

Dumbbells
Dumbbell Incline Curl: With an adjustable bench positioned at a 45-degree angle, one could perform incline biceps curls with dumbbells. Incline biceps curls are usually performed with lighter weight compare to regular biceps curls, and by sitting on the incline bench, holding the dumbbells close to the body with elbows tucked in, then performing a full curl.
 Supine dumbbell curl: To lay down supinely  on a flat bench, with a dumbbell in each hand using the neutral grip (two palms facing each other). And hang down both arm until enough tension is imposed on the shoulder. Simultaneously raise the dumbbells while supinating the wrists until biceps are fully contracted. Then drop the dumbbells to the initial position for another repetition.
 Dumbbell preacher curl: Sit on a preacher bench and adjust the seat height to a comfortable position. Keep the back of upper arms tightly attached to the preacher bench with a dumbbell in each hand. Flex the elbows until they are almost fully extended and curl the dumbbells towards shoulder until the biceps are fully contracted. Then return the dumbbells to the initial position for another repetition.
 Dumbbell reverse curl: Pronate both wrists into a shoulder-width reverse grip and grip the dumbbells in a standing position. Keep elbows stationary and curl the dumbbells towards shoulder until the biceps are fully contracted. Then drop the weight back to the starting position for another repetition.

Barbells

 Barbell preacher curl: Sit on a preacher bench and adjust the seat height to an optimal position. Keep the back of upper arms tightly attached to the preacher bench with a barbell hold by both hands. Flex the elbows until they are almost fully extended and curl the barbell towards shoulder until the biceps are fully contracted. Then return the barbell to the initial position for another repetition.

 Barbell reverse curl: Hold the barbell in a standing position with a shoulder-width reverse grip. Tuck the elbows to the side of the torso and keep the scapula pressed, so the shoulders remain stable. Drive the barbell towards the shoulder until the biceps are fully contracted. Then return the barbell to starting position for another repetition.
 Prone incline barbell curl: This variation is also known as the "spider curl" Trainers first need to lay down on an incline bench face towards the floor. Then holds a barbell with a shoulder-width supinated grip. Drive the barbell up while keeping the upper arms fixed to maintain the elbow position. Squeeze biceps to maximize contraction, then drop the barbell to the starting position for another repetition.

 Drag curl: Hold the barbell with shoulder-width underhand grip in a standing position. In this variation, the elbow doesn't need to be fixed. Instead, elbow flexion is the fundamental idea. Drive the barbell vertically up towards shoulder while elbows travel back as elbow flex. Then drive elbows forward when the forearms are beyond the chest. Raise the forearms until they are perpendicular to the torso, then drop the barbell back to the starting position for another repetition.

Cable Machine 

 Overhead cable curl: Stand in the middle of a cable machine with two pulleys in shoulder-height level, grasp a stirrup handle in each hand. Raise both upper arms parallel with shoulders, and supinate the forearms to let the palms facing the torso. Drive the stirrups inwards until biceps are fully contracted, then return the stirrups to starting position for another repetition.
 Cable curl: Hold the bar that is attached to a pulley at the lowest level in a standing position, step a foot back from the pulley to create a comfortable angle for this exercise. Keep the elbows to the side of the torso and shoulders are fixed, then raise the bar towards shoulder until biceps are fully contracted. Return the bar back to the initial position for another repetition. 
 Lying high cable curl: Lie prone on a bench that is under a cable machine with pulley at the highest level. Grasp a bar that is attached to the pulley with a shoulder-width grip, and fully extend to elbows. Keep the upper arms fixed and curl the bar towards the forehead until the elbow is fully flexed. Then return the bar to starting position for another repetition.

Body Weight 
 Body weight curl: Grip under a bar, rings or suspension trainer whilst using a supinated  grip and place your feet on the floor. Now  curl your neck towards the bar, ring or suspension trainer whilst performing forearm flexion. The position of the feet can be manipulated to change  the difficulty of the exercise.

Injuries 

Injuries can occur due to incorrect form, careless mistakes, or "ego lifting". The most common injury caused by biceps curls is a tear of the biceps tendon. There are two main causes of biceps tendon tears: heavy weight and overuse. Overuse is the result of ageing or too much exercise. In most cases, heavy weight causes the injury. Ego lifting is an attempt to lift weights that are heavier than the weightlifter's capability. During ego lifting, the lifter's form will be twisted because the weight is too heavy, and if the weight is far beyond the lifter's strength, then there is a likelihood to suffer from biceps tears.

Another injury caused by biceps curls is ulnar neuropathy, which lead to ulnar nerve conduction slowing at the elbow. This is caused by compression of the nerves against a weight bench during the exercise. Though unlikely, biceps curl can cause a rupture of the pectoralis major muscle, which is a severe injury that occurs in the chest.

References

Weight training exercises